The 1911 AAA Championship Car season consisted of 21 races, beginning in Oakland, California on February 22 and concluding in Savannah, Georgia on November 30. The de facto National Champion as poled by the American automobile journal Motor Age was Ralph Mulford and the winner of the inaugural Indianapolis 500 was Ray Harroun. Points were not awarded by the AAA Contest Board during the 1911 season. Champions of the day were decided by Chris G. Sinsabaugh, an editor at Motor Age, based on merit and on track performance. The points table was created retroactively in 1927 – all championship results should be considered unofficial.

Schedule and results

* Events on same date were run simultaneously.

Leading National Championship standings

The points paying system for the 1909–1915 and 1917–1919 season were retroactively applied in 1927 and revised in 1951 using the points system from 1920.

References

General references
http://www.champcarstats.com/year/1911.htm accessed 9/24/10
 accessed 9/24/10
http://www.motorsport.com/stats/champ/byyear.asp?Y=1911 accessed 9/24/10

AAA Championship Car season
AAA Championship Car
AAA Championship Car